Köçek ("Dancing boy") is a 1975 Turkish romantic drama film written and directed by Nejat Saydam and starring the famous Turkish actress Müjde Ar.

Plot
A romantic drama about an androgynous boy named Caniko (Müjde Ar), who is abducted by a gang and forced to dress like a woman and be a köçek. A mob attempts to rape Caniko, but when they find out he's really a boy, they stab him. He's taken to hospital where he undergoes a sex change operation. Now he works as a belly dancer and by chance, meets his buddy Adnan (Mahmut Hekimoğlu), who falls in love with him without recognizing that they are old friends.

Cast
 Müjde Ar as Caniko
 Mahmut Hekimoğlu as Adnan
 Nisa Serezli
 İlhan Daner
 Nevin Güler
 Senar Seven
 Yılmaz Gruda
 Asuman Arsan
 Yüksel Gözen
 Handan Adalı
 Nevin Nuray

References

External links

Köçek at SinemaTürk
Köçek at WorldCat.org
Köçek at Pembe Hayat KuirFest
Köçek at CITWF Film Database

1970s Turkish-language films
1975 LGBT-related films
1975 romantic drama films
1975 films
Transgender-related films
Turkish romantic drama films
Turkish LGBT-related films